In mathematics — specifically, differential geometry — the Bochner identity is an identity concerning harmonic maps between Riemannian manifolds. The identity is named after the American mathematician Salomon Bochner.

Statement of the result
Let M and N be Riemannian manifolds and let u : M → N be a harmonic map. Let du denote the derivative (pushforward) of u, ∇ the gradient, Δ the Laplace–Beltrami operator, RiemN the Riemann curvature tensor on N and RicM the Ricci curvature tensor on M. Then

See also
Bochner's formula

References

External links
 

Differential geometry
Mathematical identities